{{Infobox chef
| honorific_prefix =
| name           = Mollie Katzen| honorific_suffix =
| image          = 
| image_size     = 
| alt            = 
| caption        = 
| birth_name     = 
| birth_date     =  
| birth_place    = Rochester, New York
| death_date     = 
| death_place    = 
| death_cause    = 
| education      = 
| home_town      = 
| spouse         = 
| style          = 
| ratings        = 
| restaurants    = 
| prevrests      = 
| television     = 
| awards         = 
| website        = 
| module         = 
}}Mollie Katzen' (born October 13, 1950, in Rochester, New York, U.S.) is an American cookbook author and artist. The author of twelve cookbooks (all of which she also illustrated), she is best known for the hand-lettered, illustrated Moosewood Cookbook (1977) and The Enchanted Broccoli Forest (1982). She has written and illustrated three children's cookbooks, Pretend Soup (1994) (dubbed ″the gold standard of children's cookbooks″ by the New York Times), Honest Pretzels (1999), and Salad People (2005). In 2007 the Moosewood Cookbook was inducted into the James Beard Cookbook Hall of Fame. In 2017, her papers were collected by the National Museum of American History at the Smithsonian Institution. This includes all the hand-lettered originals, plus illustrations, from the Moosewood Cookbook and The Enchanted Broccoli Forest, and is now part of their permanent collection.

Early life
Katzen was raised in Rochester, New York in a Jewish family. She has attributed her interest in vegetarian cuisine to her kashrut-observant upbringing. Throughout grade school and high school, she attended the Eastman School of Music, where she studied oboe and piano, resulting in an Eastman Preparatory School Diploma. In 1968, Katzen entered Cornell University and later received her bachelor's degree in fine arts from the San Francisco Art Institute. She is the sister of Daniel Katzen, former Boston Symphony Orchestra horn player.

Cooking
In 1969, while at Cornell University, Katzen cooked at the Ithaca Seed Company, a macrobiotic café.

Katzen studied fine art at Cornell University and the San Francisco Art Institute, where she received a Bachelor of Fine Arts with Honors in Painting. One day, on her way to school, she heard a radio ad for rock-lawyer Rubin Glickman's  Shandygaff restaurant  Katzen took a bus from the art studio and asked to be hired. She ended up cooking and developing recipes at this cutting edge restaurant for two years, greatly influenced by the developing farm-to-table ethos of the new California cuisine.  Katzen returned to Ithaca in 1972 to help her brother Josh and friends build their new restaurant, which they named Moosewood Restaurant, after a local striped maple tree.    Katzen became one of the founders of the restaurant in 1973 and remained there until 1978.  

Cookbooks
"Mollie Katzen's Cooking Show" ran on PBS from 1995 to 2000.

Katzen has over 6 million books in print. Health Magazine named her as one of five "Women Who Changed the Way We Eat." Katzen served as a consultant to Harvard University Dining Services, helping design the Food Literacy Initiative, from 2003 through 2011. She has collaborated on many projects with Walter Willett, of the Harvard School of Public Health. 

In 2013, Katzen published her last cookbook, The Heart of the Plate,'' which she considers her best work.

Personal life
Katzen has two children. Her son, Sam Black, was a longtime dancer with the Mark Morris Dance Group, and is now the director of the company. From 1983 to 2022, Katzen lived in Kensington, CA. She has since returned to the East Coast.

Katzen spends her time studying piano and creating art. She continues writing and is working on a memoir.

Works

See also
 Joanne Weir's Cooking Class
 Martin Yan
 Jacques Pépin

References

External links
 Official site
 @molliekatzenartstudio — instagram

Jewish American writers
American women chefs
American cookbook writers
1950 births
Living people
Diet food advocates
Eastman School of Music alumni
Cornell University alumni
Harvard University staff
Writers from Rochester, New York
San Francisco Art Institute alumni
Women cookbook writers
James Beard Foundation Award winners
American women non-fiction writers
21st-century American Jews
21st-century American women
Vegetarian cookbook writers
Chefs from Berkeley, California
Chefs from New York (state)
20th-century American Jews